Ouezzane is a province in the Moroccan region of Tanger-Tetouan-Al Hoceima. It was created in 2009 from parts of Chefchaouen Province and Sidi Kacem Province, and recorded a population of 300,637 in the 2014 Moroccan census. The capital is Ouezzane.

Subdivisions
The province is divided administratively into the following municipalities and communes:

References

 
Ouezzane
Geography of Tanger-Tetouan-Al Hoceima